The North British Railway was opened in 1846 as the line from Edinburgh to Berwick-upon-Tweed, and its workshops were initially situated in St. Margarets, Edinburgh. Gradually other railways were acquired, including in 1865 the Edinburgh and Glasgow Railway, whose works at Cowlairs, Glasgow were better than that at St. Margarets, which were reduced to repairs only and all production moved to Cowlairs.

As is customary, engine classes are organized according to the man who was locomotive superintendent when the class was introduced, and to whom the design is often attributed. The NBR was rather unfortunate in its choice of locomotive superintendents, the first five of whom were sacked or forced to resign either for alleged incompetence or financial scandals.

The NBR's locomotive classification system (introduced in 1913) is not very helpful because the same letter has been applied to several different classes.  The North British Railway Study Group has developed its own classification system and a list can be found here.

These are not complete lists, as most engines acquired second-hand and from absorbed companies are not included.

Robert Thornton (1846–51)

William Smith (1851–54)
No new locomotives were built during his term of office.

Edmund George Petrie (1854)
No new locomotives were built during his term of office.

William Hurst (1855–66)
Hurst came from the Lancashire & Yorkshire Railway, to which he returned after being sacked from the NBR.

There were many variations within the classes listed here, both as built and after subsequent rebuilding.

Thomas Wheatley (1867–74)

Dugald Drummond (1874–82)

Matthew Holmes (1882–1903)

William Paton Reid (1903–19)
NBL (the North British Locomotive Company) was a private locomotive manufacturer, distinct from the North British Railway.

Walter Chalmers (1919–22) 
All previous incumbents were known as Locomotive Superintendent. Chalmers held the same position, but with the title changed to Chief Mechanical Engineer.

There were no new locomotive designs during the incumbency of Walter Chalmers as Chief Mechanical Engineer. Two new NBR H class locomotives were built under his supervision. Although these were not his design, he had drawn the designs under the direction of W P Reid, having been Chief Draughtsman (the deputy to the Locomotive Superintendent) of the NBR whilst Reid was Locomotive Superintendent.

Locomotive nicknames
As with most companies, certain classes of locomotive from the North British Railway were commonly known by distinctive names or nicknames, rather than their official class designations. The following is a guide to these nicknames, with links to articles about the respective locomotive types.

Preserved locomotives
NBR K Class 256 Glen Douglas
NBR G Class 42
NBR C Class 673 Maude

External links

Locomotives of the LNER

References

 

 
!North British
British railway-related lists
North British Railway
North British Railway
North British Railway